The 1987 Louisiana Tech Bulldogs football team was an American football team that represented Louisiana Tech University as an I-AA independent during the 1987 NCAA Division I-AA football season. In their first year under head coach Carl Torbush, the team compiled an 3–8 record.

Schedule

References

Louisiana Tech
Louisiana Tech Bulldogs football seasons
Louisiana Tech Bulldogs football